El Palmar is a town in the state of Bolívar in eastern Venezuela. It is the shire town of the Padre Pedro Chien Municipality.

References

Populated places in Bolívar (state)